Palpita albifulvata is a moth in the family Crambidae. It is found in India (Arunachal Pradesh).

References

Moths described in 1992
Palpita
Moths of Asia